Corylus cornuta, the beaked hazelnut (or just beaked hazel), is a deciduous shrubby hazel with two subspecies found throughout most of North America.

Description 
It typically grows with several trunks.

The male flowers are catkins that form in autumn, pollinating the single female flowers the following spring to allow the fruits to mature through the summer.

Tiny filaments protrude from the husk and may stick into, and irritate, skin that contacts them. The spherical nuts are small and surrounded by a hard shell.

Varieties 
There are two varieties, divided by geography:

Corylus cornuta var. cornuta – Eastern beaked hazel.
Corylus cornuta var. californica – Western beaked hazel or California hazelnut. Occurs below  in California, and below  in British Columbia. The Concow tribe called this variety  (Konkow language).

Distribution and habitat 
Eastern beaked hazel is found from southern Canada south to Georgia, while the Western beaked hazel occurs along the west coast from Alaska to California.

Ecology 
Although C. cornuta is somewhat shade tolerant, it is more common in forests with fairly open canopies than denser ones. However, it is intolerant of entirely open areas that get hot and dry. 

Fire kills the above-ground portion of the shrub, but it resprouts fairly readily after fire from its root crown or rhizomes. It recovers after fire to the extent that American Indians in California and Oregon used fire to encourage its growth.

In boreal regions, it is threatened by the invasive Siberian peashrub, which can invade and achieve dominance in understories.

Use by animals 
Deer, moose, and livestock browse the foliage of the Eastern beaked hazel, but the Western beaked hazel is considered to have low palatability for ungulates. The hazelnut weevil feeds solely off the Western beaked hazel.

American beavers prefer Eastern beaked hazel browse, and consume it to such an extent that they reduce its relative abundance in favor of conifers.

The nuts of C. cornuta californica are an important food source for squirrels, especially as a backup in times of acorn crop failure. Species such as Douglas squirrels, red squirrels and least chipmunks gather and stash the nuts, and although up to 66% of the nuts are consumed, the remainder have an elevated chance of germination due to being buried in soil or leaves. Black bears, turkeys, and white-tailed deer also consume the nuts.

Ruffed grouse consume the protein-rich catkins and young buds of Corylus cornuta.

It is used as cover by a variety of animal species, and provides good nesting for birds, especially the ruffed grouse. The white-footed vole is positively correlated with California hazelnuts in the Umpqua National Forest in Oregon.

Uses 
Native Americans used the sprouts to create baskets, fish traps, and baby carriers. The nuts were eaten and commonly used as a trade good among indigenous groups- both the Lewis and Clark expedition and prolific early naturalist David Douglas bartered for beaked hazelnuts with local peoples they encountered. It was used medicinally as emetic, for deworming, as an astringent, and for teething. 

It is considered an excellent nut, with the same uses as any hazelnut. While the beaked hazelnut does not produce as many nuts as commercial European species such as the common hazel or filbert, it is more resistant to common diseases, and has been used in breeding programs to create high-yield, disease resistant hybrids.

It is used in restoration plantings to increase biodiversity, improve food sources for wildlife, and to reduce rates of laminated root rot in nearby Douglas-fir and Sitka spruce.

Gallery

References

External links
 
 
 
 

cornuta
Flora of North America
Plants described in 1785
Edible nuts and seeds
Garden plants of North America
Ornamental trees